Parapalystes is a genus of South African huntsman spiders that was first described by P. M. C. Croeser in 1996.

Species
 it contains five species, found in South Africa:
Parapalystes cultrifer (Pocock, 1900) – South Africa
Parapalystes euphorbiae Croeser, 1996 (type) – South Africa
Parapalystes lycosinus (Pocock, 1900) – South Africa
Parapalystes megacephalus (C. L. Koch, 1845) – South Africa
Parapalystes whiteae (Pocock, 1902) – South Africa

See also
 List of Sparassidae species

References

Endemic fauna of South Africa
Araneomorphae genera
Sparassidae
Spiders of South Africa